"A Buncha Girls" is a song co-written recorded by American country music artist Frankie Ballard. It was released in February 2011 as the second single from his debut album Frankie Ballard. Ballard wrote the song with Rhett Akins, Dallas Davidson, and Ben Hayslip, who comprise The Peach Pickers.

Critical reception
Amy Sciarretto of Taste of Country gave the song a favorable review, writing that Ballard "espouses the virtues of carefree girls in his rawk ‘n’ roll-meets-country drawl." Matt Bjorke of Roughstock gave the song four stars out of five, saying that "what we have here is a delightful radio-ready song that will have the guys noddin’ their heads to the song while the girls shimmy and shake and sing-a-long."

Music video
The music video was directed by Jim Wright and premiered in May 2011.

Chart performance
"A Buncha Girls" debuted at number 59 on the U.S. Billboard Hot Country Songs chart for the week of March 5, 2011.

Year-end charts

References

2011 singles
2011 songs
Frankie Ballard songs
Reprise Records singles
Song recordings produced by Michael Knox (record producer)
Songs written by The Peach Pickers